Cell-cycle nonspecific antineoplastic agents (CCNS) refer to a class of pharmaceuticals that act as antitumor agents at all or any phases of the cell cycle.

Alkylating antineoplastic agent and anthracyclins are two examples.

References

Further reading
 
 

Antineoplastic drugs